Chance Peni-Ataera (born 17 January 1994) is a New Zealand-born rugby union footballer who plays for the Hino Red Dolphins in the Japan Top League competition. He has previously played rugby league for the Cook Islands at international level.

Background
Peni was born in Invercargill, New Zealand. He is of Cook Islands and Māori descent.

Although Peni was born in New Zealand, with a short period in the Chatham Islands, he moved to Perth, Western Australia at a young age, playing rugby for Wests Subiaco and playing for Willagee Bears in the Western Australian Rugby League. He then moved to Newcastle, New South Wales and playing for the Western Suburbs Rosellas before being signed by the Newcastle Knights. Peni was educated at Aranmore Catholic College in Perth.

Rugby league

Peni played for the Newcastle Knights NYC team in 2013 and 2014. On 10 October 2014, Peni signed a two-year deal with the Wests Tigers, starting from 2015. On 18 October 2014, Peni represented the Junior Kiwis against the Junior Kangaroos, playing on the wing and scoring a try in the 15–14 win at Mt Smart Stadium.

Peni played for the Wests Tigers New South Wales Cup team for the whole 2015 season. On 17 October 2015, Peni represented the Cook Islands in their World Cup qualifier match against the Tonga, playing at centre in the 28–8 loss at Campbelltown Stadium.

Rugby union

Force
In 2017, Peni returned home to Perth to play rugby, signing for the Western Force of the Super Rugby. In round two of the 2017 season Peni scored his first try for the team. A pass from Jono Lance after a line out, followed by an explosive run, which lead Peni to a quick try one minute into the game against the Reds. They finished 26–19 winners at nib Stadium, Perth.
Peni missed eight rounds of the 2017 season after rupturing his groin during a game against the Kings in round seven. Peni played seven games during the 2017 season scoring four tries.

Brumbies
In November 2017, after a breakout first Super Rugby season Peni left the now axed Super Rugby team the Western Force and signed a one-year deal for the Brumbies for the 2018 season, in hopes of playing future rugby for the Wallabies. Peni scored his first try for the Brumbies in round four of the 2018 season against the Rebels in a 33–10 defeat at AAMI Park, Melbourne.

Super Rugby statistics

References

External links

Wests Tigers profile

1994 births
New Zealand rugby league players
New Zealand Māori rugby league players
New Zealand sportspeople of Cook Island descent
Cook Islands national rugby league team players
Wests Tigers NSW Cup players
Junior Kiwis players
Rugby league centres
Living people
Hino Red Dolphins players
New Zealand rugby union players
Rugby union centres
Rugby union wings
Western Force players
Perth Spirit players
Rugby union players from Perth, Western Australia
ACT Brumbies players
Canberra Vikings players